Big Bend or Rainbow is an unincorporated community in Placer County, California. It lies at an elevation of 5738 feet (1749 m).

References

Unincorporated communities in Placer County, California
Yuba River
Unincorporated communities in California